The Majestic Theater of the Air, also known as The Majestic Hour, is an American musical radio program that aired on the CBS radio network between 1928 and 1932 on Sunday evenings. The series was produced and emcee'd by Wendell Hall and sponsored by Chicago's Grigsby-Grunow Company, manufacturers of Majestic Radios. It began on the CBS network in October, 1928, with a coast-to-coast hookup of 29 stations.

Eddie Cantor, Ruth Etting, and Harriet Lee
When Grigsby-Grunow expanded their broadcast to reach the full CBS network on January 6, 1929, the stars of the program were Eddie Cantor and Ruth Etting. In April, 1929, singer Harriet Lee was introduced by Hall on the show as the "Chicago Nightingale", becoming a hit on the CBS network.

Songwriter showcase
In an August 1929 program, Hall presented the songwriters J. Fred Coots and Benny Davis singing some of their past and present song hits. The tenor Redferne Hollinshead contributed five selections with an additional two songs by Edna Sedley.

Orchestra music was by Arnold Johnson and His Majestic Orchestra.

The series later moved to NBC.

References

American music radio programs
1920s American radio programs
1930s American radio programs
CBS Radio programs